The American Podiatric Medical Association (APMA) is a professional medical organization representing Doctors of Podiatric Medicine (podiatrists) within the United States.  The organization was founded in 1912 and is headquartered in Bethesda, Maryland.  Approximately 80% of podiatrists in the US are members of the APMA. Under the APMA are 53 component societies in individual states and other jurisdictions, as well as 21 affiliated and related societies. Doctors of Podiatric Medicine are physicians and surgeons who practice on the lower extremities, primarily on the foot, ankle and lower leg. The preparatory education of most DPMs includes four years of undergraduate work, followed by four years in an accredited podiatric medical school, followed by a residency of 3–4 years. After residency, podiatric physicians may choose to pursue further education through fellowships in any subspecialty of podiatric medicine.

APMA's Council on Podiatric Medical Education is the body designated by the US Department of Education to accredit the nation's podiatric medical schools. In addition, the Council has the responsibility to approve residency programs and continuing medical education programs. The Council recognizes certifying boards within podiatric medicine which meet its standards.

The official journal of the APMA is the Journal of the American Podiatric Medical Association, established in 1907.

History

The National Association of Chiropodists, progenitor to the American Podiatric Medical Association, was established in 1912.
It was renamed the American Podiatry Association (APA) in 1957. 
It was renamed the American Podiatric Medical Association (APMA) in 1984.

References

External links
American Podiatric Medical Association This website has info for the public as well as medical professionals.
Journal of the American Podiatric Medical Association Official peer-reviewed journal of the APMA.
Colorado Podiatric Medical Association Official Colorado Podiatric Medical Association
  Podiatric Professional Resource  Podiatry tools for foot care professionals

Podiatry organizations
Medical associations based in the United States
Podiatric medical schools in the United States
1912 establishments in the United States
Medical and health organizations based in Maryland